Uganik may refer to:

 Uganik Island - off the west coast of Kodiak Island, Alaska
 Uganik, Alaska - on Kodiak Island in Alaska